Djustine is an Italian comic book series created by Enrico Teodorani.

The Djustine character was created from a fusion of Sergio Corbucci's film character Django, and the Marquis de Sade's titular "Justine".

Publication history 
In the late 1990s the wild comic adventures of Djustine, a blond female gunslinger, were published as photocopies, sold only in Italy or through the mail to fans of supernatural western comics. Since 2003, Djustine has been regularly published in Italy on books by E.F.edizioni and on X-Comics magazine by Coniglio Editore and in the United States in the serie Djustine: Tales of the Twisted West by Carnal Comics.

The creator of Djustine, Enrico Teodorani, left the comic field in 2011 and then in 2013 started writing hard-boiled novels set in Italy.

Synopsis 
The normally adult-natured adventures of Djustine involve her facing supernatural creatures (such as werewolves, zombies and demonic beings). All the stories take place in a strange, gothic western world of the 1880s.

References

External links 
 Enrico Teodorani's blog